Graham Bamford (born 1 July 1944) is  a former Australian rules footballer who played with Richmond in the Victorian Football League (VFL).  :)

Notes

External links 
		

Living people
1944 births
Australian rules footballers from Victoria (Australia)
Richmond Football Club players
Hamilton Football Club players